Events in 2020 in Japanese television.

Until end of May, most anime series and television dramas had their production suspended due to the pandemic's massive impact on Japanese television since COVID-19 interrupted the production of television series for several weeks to ensure safety of various people who have been involved the previous process of filming.

Events

Ongoing

New series and returning shows

Ending

Sports Events

Special events and milestone episodes

Deaths

See also 
2020 in British television (Brexit)
2020 in television

References